John Stanly (April 9, 1774 – August 2, 1834) was a Federalist U.S. Congressman from North Carolina between 1801 and 1803 and again between 1809 and 1811. He was the father of Edward Stanly and rear admiral Fabius Stanly, and the father-in-law of General Walker Keith Armistead.

Early life
Stanly, the son of John Wright Stanly, was born in New Bern, North Carolina, and educated by private tutors before attending Princeton University. He studied law and was admitted to the bar in 1799.

Career
After practicing law and serving as a clerk and master in equity, Stanly was elected to the North Carolina House of Commons in 1798 and 1799.

In 1800, Stanly was elected as a Federalist to the 7th United States Congress (March 4, 1801 – March 3, 1803); he served again in the 11th Congress (March 4, 1809 – March 3, 1811) before returning to the practice of law. Stanly returned to the state house for several more terms, in 1812–1815, 1818–1819, and 1823–1825. He died in New Bern in 1834 and is buried in the Cedar Grove Cemetery. He is also known for killing Richard Dobbs Spaight, a signer of the Constitution, in a famous duel in 1802. Although prosecuted for the death as a murder, he was pardoned by Gov. Benjamin Williams. As a result of the duel, North Carolina passed a strict anti-duelling law prohibiting duelists from holding public office, and listing the duel as a specific crime, as opposed to a common law offense.

Personal life
Stanly had at least three sons, Edward, Fabius and Marcus Cicero. His daughter married General Walker Keith Armistead.

Legacy
Stanly County, North Carolina was formed in 1841, and named in his honor.

Research by Chris Bramlett indicates that John Stanly had no connection with the area named for him, but that the name was chosen to please state legislators. Bramlett also believed that Stanly's father John Wright Stanly was named Stanley and changed the spelling. One theory offered by Bramlett is that the elder Stanly, while on a trip to India during the American Revolution, met a British soldier named Stanley. Since he did not like the idea of being related to a British soldier, Stanly said his name was spelled without an E.

References

External links
Our Campaigns Biography

A New Nation Votes: American Election Returns 1787-1824 For Votes cast in Federal, State and Local elections in the Early Republic.

|-

1774 births
1834 deaths
American duellists
Federalist Party members of the United States House of Representatives from North Carolina
Members of the North Carolina House of Representatives
Politicians from New Bern, North Carolina
Princeton University alumni
Stanly County, North Carolina